Park Seon-Ho is a South Korean track cyclist. At the 2012 Summer Olympics, he competed in the Men's team pursuit for the national team.

References

South Korean male cyclists
Living people
Olympic cyclists of South Korea
Cyclists at the 2012 Summer Olympics
South Korean track cyclists
Asian Games medalists in cycling
Cyclists at the 2010 Asian Games
Cyclists at the 2014 Asian Games
Medalists at the 2010 Asian Games
Medalists at the 2014 Asian Games
Asian Games gold medalists for South Korea
Asian Games silver medalists for South Korea
Year of birth missing (living people)
20th-century South Korean people
21st-century South Korean people